Hebei University of Engineering is a provincial university based in Handan, Hebei, China.

It was established in 2003 from the amalgamation of individual colleges: Hebei Institute of Architectural Science and Technology, North China Institute of Water Conservancy and Hydro-electric Power, Handan Medicine College and Handan Agriculture College.

In 2006, Ministry of Education of China authorised the university to change its name to Hebei University of Engineering. The university now specialises in the fields of civil engineering, together with science disciplines, water power, agriculture and medicine.

Location

The university has four campuses, namely Main, Zhong Hua Nan, Congtai and Mingguan, the university covers an area of 2,340 mu (1,560,800 square meters), with a building area of 830,000 square meters.

Faculty structure 
The university is organised into the following departments:

School of Science
School of Architecture
School of Civil Engineering
School of Urban Construction
School of Mechanical and Electrical Engineering
School of Resource Science
School of Information Science and Electrical Engineering
School of Economy and Management
School of Humanities
School of Natural Science
School of Agriculture
School of Hydraulic and Hydro-power
School of Medicine

References

External links
 

Universities and colleges in Hebei
Educational institutions established in 2003
2003 establishments in China